Shresth Nirmohi (born 2 November 1991) is an Indian cricketer who plays for Chandigarh. He made his first class debut in the 2015–16 Ranji Trophy on 15 October 2015. He made his List A debut for Himachal Pradesh in the 2016–17 Vijay Hazare Trophy on 6 March 2017.

References

External links
 

1991 births
Living people
Indian cricketers
Himachal Pradesh cricketers
Chandigarh cricketers
Place of birth missing (living people)